Ocean is an unincorporated community and census-designated place (CDP) in Allegany County, Maryland, United States. As of the 2010 census it had a population of 32.

Ocean is located in the Georges Creek Valley of western Allegany County, along Maryland Route 936.

Demographics

References

Census-designated places in Allegany County, Maryland
Census-designated places in Maryland